Horace Peter Bailey (3 July 1881 – 1 August 1960) was an English amateur footballer who competed in the 1908 Summer Olympics and 1912 Summer Olympics.

Career
He was born in Derby and was the goalkeeper of the  English team, which won the gold medal in the football tournament. He also won five caps for the senior national side between March and June 1908.

Bailey made more than 100 appearances in the Football League.

Career statistics

Club
Source:

International
Source:

References

External links
 
 England Profile

1881 births
1960 deaths
Footballers from Derby
English footballers
England international footballers
England amateur international footballers
Association football goalkeepers
Derby County F.C. players
Leicester City F.C. players
Northern Nomads F.C. players
Blackburn Rovers F.C. players
Stoke City F.C. players
Birmingham City F.C. players
English Football League players
Footballers at the 1908 Summer Olympics
Olympic footballers of Great Britain
Olympic gold medallists for Great Britain
English Olympic medallists
Olympic medalists in football
Medalists at the 1908 Summer Olympics